Graphium glycerion, the spectacle swordtail, is a species of butterfly found in the Indomalayan realm (northern India, China, Thailand, Laos and northern Vietnam). The species was first described by George Robert Gray in 1831.

Subspecies
G. g glycerion (Nepal, Sikkim, Assam)
G. g. caschmirensis (Rothschild, 1895) (north-western India)
G. g. kimurai Murayama, 1982 (northern Thailand)
G. g. phangana (Okano, 1986) (northern Thailand)

Taxonomy
It may be a synonym of Graphium mandarinus Collins & Morris. It is however treated as a "good species" by Koiwaya. A further problem is that the name glycerion is permanently invalid as a junior primary homonym of Papilio glycerion Borkhausen, 1788.

Graphium glycerion is very little known and as with Graphium mandarinus, G. tamerlanus, G. phidias and G. olbrechtsi few specimens exist.

References

External links
Butterfly Corner — Images from Naturhistorisches Museum Wien

glycerion
Butterflies of Indochina
Butterflies of Asia
Taxa named by George Robert Gray
Butterflies described in 1831